Prescrire also known as La Revue Prescrire is a monthly medical journal in French which addresses developments in diseases, medications, and in medical techniques and technologies. Prescrire contains no advertising, and is internally financed by subscriptions and the sale of various personnel training. In contrast to many traditional medical journals, which review and publish articles submitted by external researchers, Prescrire mainly publishes reviews prepared by its own staff.

It is run by the Association Mieux Prescrire which is a not for profit. It is independent of the pharmaceutical industry. It is a member of the International Society of Drug Bulletins.

As of 2013 it had 33,500 paying subscribers. It was among the first to warn against the dangers of Mediator. Prescrire also publishes an international edition in English, titled Prescrire International.

Publication
The articles are based on a search of the literature and critical appraisal of the evidence. Each article is peer reviewed by 20-40 reviewers.

History 
The journal was established in 1981 by a group of pharmacists and physicians with a subsidy from the French Ministry of Labour, Employment, and Health.

References

External links
 

Publications established in 1981
Monthly journals
French-language journals
Pharmacology journals